Pivalic acid, also known as neovaleric acid, is a carboxylic acid with a molecular formula of (CH3)3CCO2H. This colourless, odiferous organic compound is solid at room temperature. A common abbreviation for the pivalyl or pivaloyl group (t-BuC(O)) is Piv and for pivalic acid (t-BuC(O)OH) is PivOH.
It is an isomer of valeric acid, the other two isomers of it are 2-Methylbutanoic acid and 3-Methylbutanoic acid.

Preparation

Industrial route
Pivalic acid is prepared by hydrocarboxylation of isobutene via the Koch reaction:
(CH3)2C=CH2 + CO + H2O → (CH3)3CCO2H
Such reactions require an acid catalyst such as hydrogen fluoride. tert-Butyl alcohol and isobutyl alcohol can also be used in place of isobutene. Globally, several million kilograms are produced annually. Pivalic acid is also economically recovered as a byproduct from the production of semisynthetic penicillins like ampicillin and amoxycillin.

Laboratory methods
It was originally prepared by the oxidation of pinacolone with chromic acid and by the hydrolysis of tert-butyl cyanide. Convenient laboratory routes proceed via tert-butyl chloride via carbonation of the Grignard reagent and by oxidation of pinacolone.

Applications
Relative to esters of most carboxylic acids, esters of pivalic acid are unusually resistant to hydrolysis. Some applications result from this thermal stability. Polymers derived from pivalate esters of vinyl alcohol are highly reflective lacquers. The pivaloyl (abbreviated Piv or Pv) group is a protective group for alcohols in organic synthesis. Pivalic acid is sometimes used as an internal chemical shift standard for NMR spectra of aqueous solutions. While DSS is more commonly used for this purpose, the minor peaks from protons on the three methylene bridges in DSS can be problematic. The 1H NMR spectrum at 25 °C and neutral pH is a singlet at 1.08 ppm. Pivalic acid is employed as co-catalyst in some of the Palladium catalyzed C-H functionalization reaction.

Alcohol protection
The pivaloyl group is used as a protecting group in organic synthesis. Common protection methods include treatment of alcohol with pivaloyl chloride (PvCl) in presence of pyridine.

Alternatively, the esters can be prepared using pivaloic anhydride in the presence of scandium triflate (Sc(OTf)3) or vanadyl triflate (VO(OTf)2).

Common deprotection methods involve hydrolysis with a base or other nucleophiles.

See also
Methyl pivalate

References

Alkanoic acids
Tert-butyl compounds